The Croce d'Aune is a mountain pass in the Italian Dolomites,  above sea level, between Aune and Pedavena in Belluno Province.

It became famous as the place where Tullio Campagnolo, while trying and failing to remove the rear wheel of his bicycle, invented the quick release skewer.

References

Mountain passes of the Dolomites